USS Cyane may refer to:

USS Cyane (1815), was captured from the Royal Navy in 1815 and taken into the US Navy, where she served until 1836.
, was a 22-gun sloop-of-war, launched in 1837 and decommissioned in 1871
, was formerly Gwin, renamed Cyane on 11 April 1918

United States Navy ship names